Nam Trực is a rural district of Nam Định province in the Red River Delta region of Vietnam. As of 2003 the district had a population of 203,311. The district covers an area of 162 km². The district capital lies at Nam Giang.

References

Districts of Nam Định province